Adhara Pérez Sánchez (born 2011) is a Space science prodigy and public speaker. Sánchez is a 10-year-old Mexican girl who recently graduated with a degree in systems engineering from the CNCI University and an industrial engineering degree specializing in mathematics from the Technological University of Mexico. Her IQ score is reported to be 162, which is higher than Albert Einstein's IQ of 160 and physicist Stephen Hawking's IQ.

Sánchez was invited to study astronomy at University of Arizona by president Robert C. Robbins

References 

Living people
Mexican people
21st-century Mexican people
2015 births